Beyond Blue is an Australian mental health and wellbeing support organisation. They provide support programs to address issues related to depression, suicide, anxiety disorders and other related mental illnesses.

The organisation works in partnership with governments, local health services, educational institutions, workplaces, media and community organisations, as well as the general community to raise community awareness about anxiety and depression and reduce the associated stigma. Beyond Blue was founded in 2000 by former premier of Victoria, Jeff Kennett. It is currently chaired by Julia Gillard, former prime minister of Australia. Gillard is supported by CEO Georgie Harman, and Deputy Chair Kate Carnell.

History

Beyond Blue began in October 2000 as a five-year initiative of the Australian Government and state and territory governments after a period of public debate on the treatment of depression sufferers assisted by intensive and persistent lobbying by former Premier of Victoria, Jeff Kennett. The aim was to raise awareness of depression and to reduce the associated stigma.

Politicians who have encouraged people to both donate to and utilise the services of Beyond Blue include Geoff Gallop and John Brogden.

Since 2006, the Australian Football League has supported the organisation with the Beyond Blue Cup awarded annually to the winner of clashes between the Geelong and Hawthorn football clubs.

In March 2017, it was announced that former prime minister Julia Gillard would take over as chair of Beyond Blue from founder and chairman Jeff Kennett. Gillard replaced Kennett on 2 July 2017.

Work
Beyond Blue addresses a range of mental health issues in Australia, including mental health stigma, indigenous issues, post-natal depression, school based interventions, and youth mental health.

LGBT Australians
In 2011, Jeff Kennett remarked publicly that children of gay and lesbian parents have worse mental health outcomes, and amid a resulting controversy Beyond Blue staff and supporters called on the organisation to create specific programs for gay and lesbian Australians. In 2012, Beyond Blue launched a $1.5 million year-long campaign to reduce discrimination against gay, lesbian and transgender people in Australia. In 2015, the organisation issued a statement in support of same-sex marriage.

In 2018, Beyond Blue rejected a donation of $5,000 from wrestler Dave Marshall. Marshall, who is gay, publicly stating the donation was a portion of the money he earned selling pornographic photos and videos. Beyond Blue subsequently said they would not accept money that comes from "gambling, alcohol or pornography". Marshall instead donated the money to the suicide prevention Black Dog Institute.

Activism
In 2013, Beyond Blue campaigned against the insurance industry's discrimination against people who have experienced anxiety and depression. They also launched a campaign featuring actor Ben Mendelsohn as the character "Anxiety", describing symptoms and how it feels to experience anxiety, and conducted a survey into the mental health of doctors and medical students finding very high rates of anxiety, depression and suicidal thoughts.

A 2015 survey of 1,200 Australians by TNS Australia revealed that one in five Australians still believe that people with anxiety are just "putting it on". Beyond Blue is launching another campaign on radio and TV to raise awareness of anxiety and its symptoms. Australian actor Guy Pearce provided the voice over for this campaign.

Men are a key audience for Beyond Blue and the Man Therapy campaign achieved widespread coverage. The campaign was a "first of its kind" program in Australia and featured a humorous character, "Dr Brian Ironwood", urging men to take action when it comes to their wellbeing. Launched in 2013, it was an international collaboration with the Colorado Office for Suicide Prevention, whose Man Therapy was adapted for an Australian audience. The campaign was programmed to last one year. Ipsos Social Research Institute evaluated the campaign's effectiveness for Beyond Blue and found that 1/3 of men 18 and over recognised the Man Therapy campaign, 280,000 visited the website and 5-15% of men aware of the campaign changed their attitudes to mental health.

Beyond Blue and AOMB also reached agreement to fundraise an initiative to raise awareness of anxiety and depression in Australia by organising several charity events.

References

Organizations established in 2000
Charities based in Australia
Anxiety disorder treatment
Mental health organisations in Australia
Suicide in Australia
Organisations based in Melbourne
2000 establishments in Australia